Vakivumuge Kurin is a Maldivian romantic drama television series developed for Television Maldives by Fathimath Nahula and Aishath Rishmy. The series stars Mohamed Faisal, Aishath Rishmy, Sheela Najeeb, Aminath Rishfa, Ahmed Azmeel, Mariyam Shahuza, Ahmed Aman, Mariyam Azza, Aminath Rasheedha and Ibrahim Jihad in pivotal roles. The first episode of the series was released on Television Maldives on 13 February 2015. A new episode of the series was telecast each Friday 2130.

Premise
Shahid Shafeeq (Mohamed Faisal), happily married to Reenee (Aishath Rishmy) joins a political post at a government office. Reenee's younger sister, Raanee (Aminath Rishfa) an irresponsible young lady who lives with the couple, is almost raped by her gangster boyfriend, Shaheeb (Mohamed Rifshan). She breaks up with Shaheeb and starts a romantic relationship with Nihad (Ibrahim Jihad) whom she meets on Facebook who happens to be her school life friend. Meanwhile, Shahid struggles to deal with his seductive colleague, Maisha (Mariyam Azza) whom he dated previously. Married to Dr. Amir (Ahmed Aman), Maisha mistreats her mother, (Aminath Rasheedha) and calls her a burden.

Raanee takes a loan from her friend, Mary (Sujeetha Abdulla) and marries Nihad, covering all the expenses using that money. Her life turns upside down when police arrests Nihad while using drugs. Reenee is found to be pregnant meanwhile her infertile friend, Zidhna (Mariyam Shahuza) discovers her husband, Maaz (Ahmed Azmeel) to be having an extramarital affair with Rose (Sheela Najeeb).

Cast and characters

Main
 Mohamed Faisal as Shahid Shafeeq
 Aishath Rishmy as Reenee
 Sheela Najeeb as Rose
 Aminath Rishfa as Raanee
 Ahmed Azmeel as Maaz
 Mariyam Shahuza as Zidhna
 Ahmed Aman as Amir
 Mariyam Azza as Maisha
 Aminath Rasheedha as Maisha's mother
 Ibrahim Jihad as Nihad

Recurring
 Mohamed Rifshan as Shaheeb; Reenee's boyfriend
 Sujeetha Abdulla as Mary; Raanee's friend
 Ismail Aziel Azumeel as Zellu; Maisha's son

Guest
 Hassan Liam as Nihad's friend
 Yoosuf Eethan Rameez
 Abdulla Rasheed
 Jaufar Shafeeq
 Reema Hassan
 Ali Nihad
 Mohamed Waheed as Lawyer Saleem

Soundtrack

References

Serial drama television series
Maldivian television shows